Shakeel Phinn (born October 31, 1990) is a Canadian professional boxer who has held the WBC–NABF and IBF North American super middleweight titles since 2019.

Early life
Phinn was born on October 31, 1990 in Brossard, Quebec, Canada. His father, Benjamin, was an amateur boxer. Phinn played running back at Champlain College Saint-Lambert, where he was named team offensive MVP for the 2010–11 season. He joined oneXone Boxing Gym in Saint-Hubert initially to stay conditioned and work on his footwork. He was quickly drawn into the sport and enrolled as an amateur fighter at the gym, competing in his first amateur bout at the age of 21. Within a year, he won the Quebec provincial championship.

Professional career
Phinn made his professional debut on January 31, 2015, defeating Eddie Gates via fourth-round technical knockout (TKO) in Gatineau, Quebec. However, he lost in his second bout that April against compatriot Roody Rene on the Adonis Stevenson–Sakio Bika undercard in Quebec City. After three straight victories he knocked out the third-ranked Canadian super middleweight Guillaume Tremblay-Coude in November, although he suffered the first knockdown of his career in the fight. Three months later, just over a year after turning pro, he beat hometown hero Paul Bzdel in Saskatoon to win the vacant  national super-middleweight title. His unanimous decision (UD) victory headlined the first night of professional boxing held in the city in 16 years. His eventual sixteen-fight winning streak would be snapped in December 2017, when he suffered his second career loss versus undefeated Mexican prospect Ramón Aguiñaga by majority decision (MD) in Montreal, falling to 16–2.

On December 1, 2018, he faced undefeated American Dario Bredicean for the vacant IBF Inter-Continental super middleweight title on the Adonis Stevenson–Oleksandr Gvozdyk undercard in Quebec City, the night Stevenson suffered a life-threatening brain injury that prematurely ended his career. Phinn battled the Chicago native to a controversial majority draw – one judge scored it 98–92 in clear favor of Phinn, but was overruled by the other two who scored it 95–95. After a win over Mexican journeyman Juan Carlos Raygosa, he defeated Argentine southpaw Elio Germán Rafael on June 8, 2019 by tenth-round TKO for the vacant WBC–NABF and IBF North American super-middleweight titles. In November he travelled to Poland to face undefeated local Mateusz Tryc, losing by UD after eight rounds for the third loss of his career.

Professional boxing record

Personal life
He co-owns the Donnybrook Boxing Gym in LaSalle, Montreal with fellow pro fighter Ian MacKillop. Within a year of its opening, it housed more professional fighters than any other gym in the country.

References

External links
 

1990 births
Living people
Canadian male boxers
Super-middleweight boxers
Canadian people of Jamaican descent
Black Canadian boxers
People from Brossard
Sportspeople from Quebec